Ralph L. Maxwell (April 9, 1905 – August 29, 1956) was an American jurist.

Born in Nashville, Illinois, Maxwell received his bachelor's degree from University of Illinois and his law degree from the University of Illinois College of Law. He practiced law in Nashville, Illinois. He served as state's attorney and as circuit court judge for Washington County, Illinois. From 1951 until his death in 1956, Maxwell served on the Illinois Supreme Court.

Notes

1905 births
1956 deaths
People from Nashville, Illinois
University of Illinois alumni
Illinois state court judges
Justices of the Illinois Supreme Court
20th-century American judges